These are the official results of the Women's Individual Pursuit at the 1996 Summer Olympics in Atlanta, United States.

Medalists

Results

Qualifying round

Quarter-finals

Semi-finals

Final

References

External links
IOC web site
Union cycliste internationale web site

W
Cycling at the Summer Olympics – Women's individual pursuit
Track cycling at the 1996 Summer Olympics
Olymp
Cyc